Poeaessa or Poiaessa was a town of the borderlands between ancient Messenia and Laconia, mentioned by Strabo. Strabo relates that it was founded by Teleclus, king of Sparta, in the 8th century BCE, along with the cities of Echeiae and Tragium, and Poeaessa contained a sanctuary of Athena Nedusia.

Its site is unlocated, although it has been suggested that it was located, like the other cities founded by Teleclus, near the upper course of the Nedon River.

References

Populated places in ancient Laconia
Populated places in ancient Messenia
Former populated places in Greece
Lost ancient cities and towns